Democratic Peasants' Party may refer to:
Democratic Peasants' Party (Bukovina)
Democratic Peasants' Party–Lupu
Democratic Peasants' Party–Stere

See also
Democratic Farmers' Party of Germany